Rosalio D. Martires (born September 9, 1951), also known as Yoyong Martirez, is a Filipino retired basketball player, actor and comedian. He is a former councilor for the City of Pasig.

Basketball career 
Martires played for San Miguel in the Manila Industrial and Commercial Athletic Association and the Philippine Basketball Association between 1972 and 1982.

In 1972, he participated at the Olympic Games in Munich, Germany as a member of the Philippine national basketball team. He was a fleet-footed guard specializing in steals/interceptions and assists.

Acting career
Besides from playing Basketball, Yoyong becomes an iconic Filipino comedian mostly in the 80's and also even 90's as well. His debut movie was, Ma'am May We Go Out? with Tito, Vic & Joey, released in 1985 by Viva Entertainment. He also appeared on comedy shows like Iskul Bukol, Mixed N.U.T.S, TODAS, Daddy Di Do Du, Fulhaus, 1 For 3, Vampire Ang Daddy Ko, currently he's still both active in movies and TV from the 70s to present.

Filmography

Films

Television

Bawal Ang Game Show (TV5, 2021)
John En Ellen! (TV5, 2021)
Fill In The Banks (TV5, 2021)
Chika Besh (TV5, 2020)
O My Dad (TV5, 2020)
Mars Pa More (GMA 7, 2020)
Daddys Gurl (GMA 7, 2020)
Tunay Na Buhay (GMA 7, 2019)
Bossing & Ai (GMA 7, 2018)
Dear Uge (GMA 7, 2016)
Vampire Ang Daddy Ko (GMA 7, 2015-2018) guest
No Harm, No Foul (TV5, 2015)
Sabado Badoo (GMA 7, 2015)
Pepito Manaloto (GMA 7, 2015)
Mars (GMA News TV 27 "now GTV 27", 2014-2019) - guest
Celebrity Samurai (TV5, 2013)
Pidols Wonderland (TV5, 2012)
My Darling Aswang (TV5, 2011)
The Jose & Wally Show Starring Vic Sotto (TV5, 2011)
Star Confessions (TV5, 2010)
Show Me The Manny (GMA 7, 2009)
Talentadong Pinoy (TV5, 2009-2014) - guest celebrity judge
S Files (GMA 7, 2008-2015)
Fulhaus (GMA 7, 2007-2013) - guest
Bubble Gang (GMA 7, 2005 – present) - guest
Home Along Da Airport (ABS-CBN 2, 2003-2005)
Daddy Di Do Du (GMA 7, 2002-2007) - guest
Super Klenk (GMA 7, 2000) - guest
The Buzz (ABS-CBN 2, 1999-2015) - guest
1 For 3 (GMA 7, 1997-2002) - guest
Wow Mali! (TV5, 1996-2006)
Okay Ka Fairy Ko The Sitcom (GMA 7, 1995-1997)
Eat Bulaga (ABS-CBN 2, 1994-1995; GMA 7 1995 – present) - guest
Mixed N.U.T.S. (GMA 7, 1994-1997)
Rock & Roll 2000 (TV5, 1993)
Purungtong (RPN 9, 1993) - guest
Home Along Da Riles (ABS-CBN 2, 1992-2003)
TVJ On 5 (TV5, 1992)
Four Da Boys (IBC 13, 1989) - guest
Hapi House (IBC 13, 1988) - guest
TODAS (IBC 13, 1985-1988) - guest
Plaza 1899 (RPN 9, 1987) - guest
Goin Bananas (IBC 13, 1986-1987; ABS-CBN 2 1987-1991)
Family 3 Plus 1 (GMA 7, 1985)
John En Marsha (RPN 9, 1985-1990) - guest
Iskul Bukol (IBC 13, 1977-1989) - guest

References

External links
IMDb Profile - Rosalio "Yoyong" Martirez

1951 births
Living people
People from Catbalogan
People from Pasig
Filipino people of Chinese descent
Filipino male comedians
Filipino actor-politicians
Filipino Roman Catholics
Nacionalista Party politicians
Basketball players from Samar (province)
Metro Manila city and municipal councilors
Olympic basketball players of the Philippines
Basketball players at the 1972 Summer Olympics
Philippines men's national basketball team players
Filipino men's basketball players
1974 FIBA World Championship players
Basketball players at the 1974 Asian Games
Asian Games competitors for the Philippines
Filipino sportsperson-politicians
Filipino male film actors
Filipino male television actors